{{DISPLAYTITLE:C13H20N2O2}}
The molecular formula C13H20N2O2 (molar mass: 236.31 g/mol, exact mass: 236.1525 u) may refer to:

 Dropropizine, a cough suppressant
 Levodropropizine
 Metabutethamine
 Procaine